The 2019 Appalachian State Mountaineers football team represented Appalachian State University during the 2019 NCAA Division I FBS football season. The Mountaineers were led by first-year head coach Eliah Drinkwitz through the team's win in the Sun Belt Conference Championship Game, after which he left to fill the head coaching vacancy at Missouri. Shawn Clark led the team during their bowl game appearance. Appalachian State played their home games at Kidd Brewer Stadium on the school's Boone, North Carolina, campus, and competed as a member of the East Division of the Sun Belt Conference.

Previous season
The Mountaineers finished the 2018 season 12–1, 7–1 in Sun Belt play to be co-champions of the East Division with Troy. Due to their head-to-head win over Troy, they represented the East Division in the inaugural Sun Belt Championship Game where they defeated West Division champion Louisiana to become Sun Belt Champions for the third consecutive year and first time outright. They were invited to the New Orleans Bowl where they defeated Middle Tennessee.

Preseason

Recruiting
The Mountaineers signed 18 recruits.

Personnel

Coaching staff

Roster

Source:

Schedule

Schedule Source:

Game summaries

East Tennessee State

Charlotte

at North Carolina

Coastal Carolina

at Louisiana

Louisiana–Monroe

at South Alabama

Georgia Southern

at South Carolina

at Georgia State

Texas State

at Troy

Sun Belt Championship Game

Rankings

Players drafted into the NFL

References

Appalachian State
Appalachian State Mountaineers football seasons
Sun Belt Conference football champion seasons
New Orleans Bowl champion seasons
Appalachian State Mountaineers football